Carlos Berlocq and Brian Dabul were the defending champions but decided not to participate.
Nikola Ćirić and Goran Tošić won the title, defeating Marcel Felder and Diego Schwartzman 7–6(7–5), 7–6(7–4) in the final.

Seeds

Draw

Draw

References
 Main Draw

Copa Petrobras Montevideo - Doubles
2011 Doubles
2011 in Uruguayan tennis